This is a list of recurring actors on the US television show Desperate Housewives. Every actor credited in two episodes or more is included in the article.

Main cast

Characters are listed in the order they were first credited in the series.

Starring

Supporting

 In season six Andrea Bowen, Kathryn Joosten and Beau Mirchoff were only credited in the episodes they appear in.
 Kathryn Joosten was credited as Also Starring in season six, except for episode 6x23 in which she was credited as Starring.
 In season seven Kathryn Joosten, Kevin Rahm, Tuc Watkins, Charlie Carver, Joshua Logan Moore, Darcy Rose Byrnes, Madison De La Garza and Mason Vale Cotton were only credited in the episodes they appear in, although Madison De La Garza was credited in episode 7x05 in which she didn't appear.
 Joy Lauren and Rachel Fox weren't credited in episode 4x01.
 Roger Bart was credited as Also Starring from episode 2x02 to 2x09 and as a Special Guest Star in episode 2x24.
 Page Kennedey was credited as Also Starring in episodes 2x03, 2x05, 2x06 and 2x07, before being replaced by NaShawn Kearse.
 NaShawn Kearse was credited as Also Starring from episode 2x08 to 2x24, replacing Page Kennedey. However he was credited as Nashawn Kearse in episodes 2x08, 2x09 and 2x10.
 Josh Henderson was credited as Also Starring from episode 3x01 to 3x16.
 Jeffrey Nordling wasn't credited in episode 6x06.

Guest cast

A
Ian Abercrombie - Rupert Cavanaugh (1 episode, season 3)
Isabella Acres - Jenny Hunter-McDermott (3 episodes, seasons 7–8)
Jillian Armenante - Rachel (2 episodes, season 8)
Rochelle Aytes - Amber James (3 episodes, season 7)
Anthony Azizi - Robert Falati (2 episodes, season 3)
Scott Atkinson appears as a police officer in four episodes, one per season in Seasons 1 - 4

B
Charlie Babcock - Stu Durber (6 episodes, seasons 2 and 5)
Scott Bakula - Trip Weston (5 episodes, season 8)
Cecilia Balagot - Grace Sanchez (4 episodes, season 7)
Daniella Baltodano - Celia Solis (50 episodes, seasons 4-8)
John Barrowman - Patrick Logan (6 episodes, season 6)
Justine Bateman - Ellie Leonard (5 episodes, season 4 and 8)
Orson Bean - Roy Bender (23 episodes, seasons 6-8)
Polly Bergen - Stella Wingfield (10 episodes, seasons 3-5, and 7)
Emily Bergl - Beth Young (14 episodes, seasons 7-8)
Julie Benz - Robin Gallagher  (6 episodes, season 6)
Daniela Bobadilla - Marisa Sanchez (2 episodes, season 8)
John Bobek - Tucker (2 episodes, season 3)
Michael Bofshever - Kenny Stevens (2 episodes, season 3)
Lesley Boone - Lucy Blackburn (2 episodes, season 5)
Terry Bozeman - Dr. Lee Craig (6 episodes, seasons 1-3)
Jill Brennan - Tish Atherton (5 episodes, seasons 1-3)
Pat Crawford Brown - Ida Greenberg (24 episodes, seasons 1-4)

C
Marie Caldare - Lila Dash (4 episodes, season 5)
Scott Allan Campbell - Detective Sloan (2 episodes, season 2)
Ridge Canipe - Danny Farrell (2 episodes, seasons 2 and 3)
Ryan Carnes - Justin (11 episodes, seasons 1−2)
Dixie Carter - Gloria Hodge (7 episodes, season 3)
Christina Chang - D.A. Emily Stone (3 episodes, season 8)
Jake Cherry - Travers McLain (5 episodes, season 3)
Nick Chinlund - Detective Sullivan (5 episodes, seasons 1-2)
Emily Christine - Ashley Bukowski (2 episodes, season 1)
Christine Clayburg - Reporter (6 episodes, seasons 3, 6 and 8)
Gary Cole - Wayne Davis (6 episodes, season 4)
Maria Cominis - Mona Clarke (11 episodes, seasons 1-3, 5-6 and 8)
Frances Conroy - Virginia Hildebrand (3 episodes, season 5)
Brett Cullen - Detective Burnett (2 episodes, season 1)

D
Gregg Daniel - Dr. Sicher (2 episodes, season 1)
Mark Deklin - Bill Pearce (2 episodes, season 3)
Michael Dempsey - Detective Murphy (8 episodes, seasons 6-8)
Reed Diamond - Gregg Limon (2 episodes, season 8)
Paul Dooley - Addison Prudy (3 episodes, season 2)
Jeff Doucette - Father Crowley (10 episodes, seasons 1-6)
Nike Doukas - Natalie Klein (3 episodes, seasons 1 and 8)
Shawn Doyle - Mr. Hartley (2 episodes, season 1)
Jennifer Dundas - Rebecca Shepherd (2 episodes, season 3)
Michael Durrell - Myron Katzburg (3 episodes, season 3)

E
Edward Edwards - Dan Peterson (2 episodes, season 1)
Jayne Entwistle - Marilyn (3 episodes, season 8)
Christine Estabrook - Martha Huber (10 episodes, seasons 1, 5, 7-8)

F
Patrick Fabian - Frank (2 episodes, season 8)
Stephanie Faracy - Miss Charlotte (2 episodes, season 7)
Mike Farrell - Milton Lang (3 episodes, seasons 3-4)
Miguel Ferrer - Andre Zeller (5 episodes, season 8)
Nathan Fillion - Adam Mayfair (12 episodes, season 4)
Joely Fisher - Nina Fletcher (5 episodes, season 2)
Kurt Fuller - Detective Barton (5 episodes, season 2)

G
Albert Garcia - Luis (2 episodes, season 2)
Jason Gedrick - Rick Coletti (6 episodes, seasons 3-4)
Ellen Geer - Lillian Simms (4 episodes, seasons 3-4 and 8)
Mary Pat Gleason - Elenora Butters (2 episodes, seasons 1 and 5)
Juliette Goglia - Amy Pearce (2 episodes, season 3)
Currie Graham - Ed Ferrara (9 episodes, seasons 2-3)
Brian Austin Green - Keith Watson (15 episodes, season 7)
Melissa Greenspan - Cindy (4 episodes, seasons 7-8)
Todd Grinnell - Alex Cominis (6 episodes, seasons 5 and 7)
Bob Gunton - Noah Taylor (10 episodes, seasons 1−2)

H
Larry Hagman - Frank Kaminsky (2 episodes, season 7)
Melinda Page Hamilton - Sister Mary Bernard (3 episodes, season 2)
Jay Harrington - Dr. Ron McCready (7 episodes, season 2)
Harriet Sansom Harris - Felicia Tilman (28 episodes, seasons 1−2 and 7)
Gale Harold - Jackson Braddock (14 episodes, seasons 4-5)
Kathryn Harrold - Helen Rowland (3 episodes, seasons 1−2)
Megan Hilty - Shayla Grove (2 episodes, season 5)
Nichole Hiltz - Libby Collins (3 episodes, season 2)
Ernie Hudson - Detective Ridley (7 episodes, season 3)

I
Michael Ironside - Curtis "Curt" Monroe (2 episodes, season 2)
Gregory Itzin - Dick Barrows (2 episodes, season 7)

J
Bruce Jarchow - Sam Bormanis (4 episodes, season 2)
Peter Jason - Jeff (2 episodes, season 3)
Jolie Jenkins - Deirdre Taylor (2 episodes, season 1)
Carla Jimenez - Carmen Sanchez (4 episodes, season 7)
Leslie Jordan - Felix Bergman (2 episodes, season 8)

K
John Kapelos - Eugene Beale (4 episodes, season 2)
Lainie Kazan - Maxine Rosen (5 episodes, season 7)
Dagney Kerr - Ruth Ann Heisel (3 episodes, seasons 1-2)
Brian Kerwin - Harvey Bigsby (2 episodes, season 3)
Shirley Knight - Phyllis Van de Kamp (5 episodes, seasons 2 and 4)

L
John Lacy - Detective Beckerman (2 episodes, season 1)
Sal Landi - Donny the Loan Shark (5 episodes, season 8)
Sharon Lawrence - Maisy Gibbons (3 episodes, season 1)
Scotty Leavenworth - Kirby Schilling (2 episodes, season 5)
Gloria LeRoy - Rose Kemper (2 episodes, season 5)
Mary Margaret Lewis - Renee (2 episodes, season 3)
Ruby Lewis - Chloe Carlson (2 episodes, season 8)
Beth Littleford - Dana (2 episodes, seasons 7-8)
Sam Lloyd - Dr. Albert Goldfine (8 episodes, seasons 1-2)
Wayne Lopez - Clyde (3 episodes, seasons 3) and Air Marshal (1 episode, season 2)
Aaron Lustig - Craig Lynwood (3 episodes, season 7)
Jennifer Lyons - Cecile (2 episodes, season 2)

M
Justina Machado - Claudia Sanchez (2 episodes, season 8)
Tanner Maguire - Zach Young, age 4 (4 episodes, seasons 1−2)
Valerie Mahaffey - Alma Hodge (8 episodes, season 3 and 8)
Carol Mansell - Pat Ziegler (4 episodes, season 2)
Alec Mapa - Vern (5 episodes, seasons 2−3)
John Mariano - Oliver Weston (2 episodes, season 2)
Dakin Matthews - Reverend Sykes (7 episodes, seasons 1-4, 6-8)
Helena Mattsson - Irina Korsakov (3 episodes, season 6)
Billy Mayo - Detective Lyons (5 episodes, seasons 4-5)
James Luca McBride - Al Kaminsky (3 episodes, season 4) and Cop at Applewhite's (1 episode, season 2)
Eddie McClintock - Frank Helm (3 episodes, season 2)
Melinda McGraw - Annabel Foster (3 episodes, season 1)
Laurie Metcalf - Carolyn Bigsby (4 episodes, season 3)
Rolando Molina - Hector Sanchez (3 episodes, season 7)
Tim Monsion - Dr. Cunningham (2 episodes, season 2)
Felice Heather Monteith - Nurse Marcy (2 episodes, season 3)
Chloë Grace Moretz - Sheri Maltby (2 episodes, season 3)
Betty Murphy - Alberta Fromme (5 episodes, seasons 1-3)
Harry S. Murphy - Mr. Lentz (3 episodes, seasons 1-2)

N
Bob Newhart - Morty Flickman (3 episodes, seasons 1−2)
John Haymes Newton - Jonathan Lithgow (2 episodes, season 1)

O
Conor O'Farrell - Detective Copeland (3 episodes, season 1)
Gail O'Grady - Anne Schilling (4 episodes, season 5)
Shannon O'Hurley - Mrs. Truesdale (2 episodes, seasons 1-2)
Peter Onorati - Warren Schilling (2 episodes, season 5)
Lupe Ontiveros - Juanita "Mama" Solis (8 episodes, seasons 1 and 8)
Ion Overman - Maria Scott (3 episodes, season 5)

P
Sam Page - Sam Allen (7 episodes, season 6)
Dougald Park - Xiao-Mei's doctor (3 episodes, seasons 2-3)
Andrea Parker - Jane Carlson (11 episodes, season 8)
Adrian Pasdar - David Bradley (3 episodes, season 2)
Alejandro Patino - Ralph (5 episodes, season 2)
Tony Plana - Alejandro Perez (5 episodes, seasons 7-8)

Q

R
Alyson Reed - Judge Conti (3 episodes, season 8)
Matt Roth - Art Shepherd (4 episodes, season 3)
Richard Roundtree - Jerry Shaw (5 episodes, season 1)
Jeremy Rowley - Nurse Erik (2 episodes, season 8)
John Rubinstein - Principal Hobson (7 episodes, seasons 5-8)

S
John Schneider - Richard Watson (4 episodes, season 7)
Dougray Scott - Ian Hainsworth (18 episodes, season 3)
Sayeed Shahidi - Charlie James (3 episodes, season 7)
James Shanklin - Detective Morgan (2 episodes, season 2)
Mitch Silpa - Jerry (3 episodes, seasons 2-3)
John Slattery - Victor Lang (14 episodes, seasons 3-4)
Lois Smith - Allison Scavo (2 episodes, season 7)
Marla Sokoloff - Claire (3 episodes, season 1)
Jake Soldera - Benjamin Katz (3 episodes, seasons 5, 7-8)
Lucille Soong - Yao Lin (7 episodes, seasons 1 and 5)
Kylie Sparks - Kim (3 episodes, season 3)
Stephen Spinella - Dr. Samuel Heller (4 episodes, season 5)
David Starzyk - Bradley Scott (5 episodes, seasons 5 and 8)
Heather Stephens - Kendra Taylor (2 episodes, season 1)
Mindy Sterling - Mitzi Kinsky (6 episodes, season 6-7)
Lindsey Stoddart - Melissa (2 episodes, season 8)
Elizabeth Storm - Janie Peterson (2 episodes, season 1)
Jeffrey Stubblefield - Jerome (2 episodes, season 3)
Kevin Symons - Jack Pinkham (3 episodes, seasons 6-7)

T
Mark L. Taylor - Mr. Steinberg (2 episodes, season 1)
Lee Tergesen - Peter McMillan (5 episodes, season 2)
Lily Tomlin - Roberta Simmons (6 episodes, season 5)
Nancy Travis - Mary Wagner (2 episodes, season 7)
Stacey Travis - Jordana Geist (3 episodes, seasons 1 and 3)
Steve Tyler - Minister (5 episodes, seasons 2 and 3 and 4 and 5)

U

V
Joyce Van Patten - Carol Prudy (2 episodes, season 2)

W
Dale Waddington Horowitz - Nurse Voorhees (6 episodes, seasons 2-3 and 6-7)
Melora Walters - Sylvia Greene (3 episodes, season 4)
Kiersten Warren - Nora Huntington (9 episodes, seasons 2−3 and 8)
Lesley Ann Warren - Sophie Bremmer (6 episodes, seasons 1−2, 7)
Cheyenne Wilbur - Edwin Mullins (3 episodes, season 1)
Matt Winston - Lazaro (2 episodes, season 8)
Wendy Worthington - Nurse Parker (2 episodes, season 3)
Becky Wu - Amy Yamada (4 episodes, season 8)

X

Y
Gwendoline Yeo - Xiao-Mei (9 episodes, seasons 2–3)
Kathleen York - Monique Polier (3 episodes, season 3)

Z
Josh Zuckerman - Eddie Orlofsky - (11 episodes, season 6)

References

Cast
Desperate Housewives
Desperate Housewives
Desperate Housewives